Thomas Gabriel (born 25 August 1957) is a German church musician, composer and arranger.

Career 

From 1989 to 1991 he was district cantor at St. Martin, Idstein, where he founded a youth choir called Martinis in 1988. From 1992 to 1997 he was regional cantor in Saarbrücken. Since 1998, he has been cantor for the Regional Institute of Sacred Music in the Diocese of Mainz with a focus on "" (New sacred song), for the deaneries Offenbach, Rodgau and Seligenstadt, at the church ).

Gabriel gives many concerts as an organist, harpsichordist and pianist, particularly as a member of the Thomas Gabriel Trio, whose artistic focus is on jazz arrangements of the music of Johann Sebastian Bach.

As a composer, Gabriel tries to combine traditional church music with elements from jazz and pop. He composed in 2005 Missa mundi (Mass of the world) for the final mass of the World Youth Day in Cologne on 21 August 2005, representing five continents in style and instrumentation: a European  influenced by the style of Bach, a South American  with guitars and pan flutes, an Asian  with sitar, an African  with drums, and an Australian  with didgeridoos. It was premièred by a project choir from the Würzburg Cathedral, conducted by Martin Berger, with Gabriel at the keyboard. He participated in the project  (Mass of the Diocese of Mainz), a collaboration of six regional cantors to create a mass in German for choir, a high voice (children's choir or soprano) and organ. Dan Zerfaß composed , Nicolo Sokoli , Thomas Gabriel , Andreas Boltz , Ralf Stiewe , Ruben J. Sturm .

Selected works 

 Daniel, rock oratorio
  (Mainz Mass), for three-part mixed choir, keyboard (organ, piano) and brass (trumpet, saxophon, trombone), text by Raymund Weber
 , musical
 1999:  (Martin in Mainhattan – nickname of Frankfurt), musical
 2002: Emmaus, oratorio, text by Eugen Eckert
  for solo, four-part mixed choir and instruments, a mass of solidarity with  Bolivia
 compositions for the closing service of the 95th Katholikentag in Ulm
 2004: Bonifatius, oratorio, text by 
 2005:  (Mass of the world), final mass of the World Youth Day on 21 August 2005

 2006:  (Towards the sun), musical on the life of Saint Edith Stein, including texts by students of the 
 2006: , oratorio

 2010: Junia, oratorio, text by Eckert
 2017: Bruder Martin, oratorio, text by Eckert

References

External links 
 label www.engelsklang.de
 Regionalkantor Thomas Gabriel basilika.de 

1957 births
German classical organists
German male organists
German harpsichordists
German male composers
German composers
Living people
Musicians from Essen
Folkwang University of the Arts alumni
21st-century organists
21st-century German male musicians
Male classical organists